Events from the year 1577 in Ireland.

Incumbent
Monarch: Elizabeth I

Events
January 11 – Palesmen sends delegates to England to complain of the burden of the cess.
June – James FitzMaurice FitzGerald is in Spain plotting rebellion in Ireland with the support of Pope Gregory XIII.
October 25 – Brian O'Rourke agrees with Sir Nicholas Malby (Lord President of Connaught) for payment to the English crown for his lordship of West Bréifne.
November  – the Great Comet of 1577 is visible.
November/December – Massacre of Mullaghmast: The Ó Moores and O'Connors have most of their fine (or ruling families)  massacred by English soldiers at Mullaghmast (County Kildare) having been invited there for peace talks.
Athenry is sacked by the Mac an Iarla, the sons of the Richard Burke (Ulick and John). This follows their previous attack in 1572.

Births

Deaths
January 4 – William Walsh, Roman Catholic Bishop of Meath (b. c.1512)
Richard Talbot, judge (b. c.1520)

References

1570s in Ireland
Years of the 16th century in Ireland